The Spin Alternative Record Guide is a music reference book compiled by the American music magazine Spin and published in 1995 by Vintage Books. It was edited by rock critic Eric Weisbard and Craig Marks, who was the magazine's editor-in-chief at the time. The book features essays and reviews from a number of prominent critics on albums, artists, and genres considered relevant to the alternative music movement. Contributors who were consulted for the guide include Ann Powers, Rob Sheffield, Simon Reynolds, and Michael Azerrad.

The book did not sell particularly well and received a mixed reaction from reviewers in 1995. The quality and relevance of the contributors' writing were praised, while the editors' concept and comprehensiveness of alternative music were seen as ill-defined. Nonetheless, it inspired a number of future music critics and helped revive the career of folk artist John Fahey, whose music was covered in the guide.

Content 

Spanning 468 pages, the Spin Alternative Record Guide compiles essays by 64 music critics on recording artists and bands who either predated, were involved in, or had developed from alternative rock. Each artist's entry is accompanied by their discography, with albums rated a score between one and ten. Unlike the third and most recent edition of The Rolling Stone Album Guide (1992), which limited its discographies to albums currently in-print on CD, the Spin Alternative Record Guide offered more comprehensive album discographies. The entries are accompanied by album artwork.

The book's editors, critic Eric Weisbard and Spin editor-in-chief Craig Marks, featured contributions from noted journalists and critics such as Charles Aaron, Gina Arnold, Michael Azerrad, Byron Coley, Ann Powers, Simon Reynolds, Alex Ross, Rob Sheffield, and Neil Strauss. Sheffield wrote the bulk of the guide's entries, while Powers "allowed her home to become command central on the book for many months". Though he did not contribute his own writing, Robert Christgau assisted in the creation of the guide by loaning out records from his personal collection as needed.

The contributors curated an overall "Top 100 Alternative Albums" list in an appendix, ranking the Ramones' 1976 self-titled debut album at number one. A few dozen personal top-ten record lists from contributors and musicians are interspersed throughout the book. The musicians who provided their own top-ten lists are Mark Arm, Lori Barbero, Lou Barlow, Kurt Bloch, King Coffey, Digable Planets (members Craig "Knowledge" Irving and Mariana "Ladybug" Vieira), Tanya Donelly, Greg Dulli, Gordon Gano, Greg Graffin, Kristin Hersh, Georgia Hubley, Calvin Johnson, Jon Langford, Courtney Love, Barbara Manning, Mac McCaughan, Buzz Osborne (listed as King Buzzo), Joey Ramone, Jim Reid, Lætitia Sadier, Sally Timms, Steve Turner, and Josephine Wiggs.

Scope and definition of "alternative" 
Even by the standards of the time, the Spin Alternative Record Guide took an unusually inclusive approach to the boundaries of what "alternative" could mean. Before 1991, the genre "alternative rock" conventionally referred to post-punk and college rock. Within a few years, "alternative" had broadened into a catchall term for any rock bands outside the mainstream, regardless of their particular style—even as, paradoxically, "alternative" music became hugely popular and commercially successful. As a result, "alternative" was increasingly derided as a vague or even incoherent category.

As summarized by the scholar Gayle Wald, the book's introduction defined "alternative" rock as "an aesthetic that disavows, or evinces critical mistrust of, earlier rock subjectivities as well as the music industry itself". Rather than limiting its scope strictly within the musical genre of "rock" per se, the guide's coverage encompassed a wide range of non-rock artists who had adopted an anti-commercial stance or were aligned with a particular subculture. In an introductory essay titled "What Is Alternative Rock?", Weisbard explored the genre's origins and, more broadly, "alternative sensibilities" in other musical traditions. "Alternative rock lacks the proud boundaries that rock's original tradition kept so well guarded", he wrote:

The book's selection of music was shaped by the generation gap between the baby boomers and Generation X. Marks said he and Weisbard "saw [the book] as a way to give definition to second-generation rock 'n' roll". In this respect, the book was both intended and received as a generational counterpoint to The Rolling Stone Album Guide. 

The guide spans 379 entries in total. An entry in the book typically covers a single artist or band; a set of closely affiliated artists; a multi-volume series of various artists compilations; or a selected discography representing an entire musical genre. Records in the guide were chosen from a variety of genres considered relevant to alternative music's development. These include 1970s punk rock, 1980s college rock, 1990s indie rock, noise music, reggae, electronic, new wave, heavy metal, krautrock, synthpop, disco, alternative country, hip hop, grunge, worldbeat, and avant-garde jazz. Acknowledging the possibility that their selections and exclusions would be objectionable to some readers, Weisbard wrote the following in the introduction: "Not all these choices are defensible: As stated at the onset, alternative lacks strong boundaries. But we had to draw the line somewhere." Weisbard and Marks said the book was meant to be "suggestive" of alternative music, rather than "comprehensive".

Most artists associated with classic rock are excluded. For example, the guide omits the Beatles, the Beach Boys, Cream, Peter Gabriel, Jimi Hendrix, Led Zeppelin, Pink Floyd, the Rolling Stones, Van Halen, and Frank Zappa—even though each of these artists meaningfully influenced "alternative" music to some extent. However, a handful of artists associated with the "classic rock" era can be found in the guide, among them Iggy Pop, Lou Reed, Neil Young, and AC/DC.

A range of mainstream pop artists spanning a variety of styles are given entries, including Culture Club, Duran Duran, and Lenny Kravitz. Some pop musicians are afforded prominent placement and a perhaps surprisingly high degree of acclaim. For instance, the very first alphabetical entry is the Swedish pop supergroup ABBA. Madonna's 1990 greatest hits album The Immaculate Collection is ranked as the 11th best alternative record. Other non-rock artists reviewed in the book include jazz composer Sun Ra, country singer-songwriter Lyle Lovett, and Qawwali singer Nusrat Fateh Ali Khan.

Rating system

Records received a rating between 1–10 points based on the judgment of the reviewer. A red dingbat beside a record's title indicated that it also appeared in the Top 100 at the back of the book. Several records in the Top 100 received a score lower than 10, while many records that received a 10 did not appear in the Top 100, because an individual reviewer's assessment could conflict with the list's collective consensus (and vice versa). Still, there was some editorial oversight and control of the ratings, as Weisbard later explained:

Records that received a 10 
The following 172 records received the guide's highest score from the reviewer who rated the discography of the given artist, compilation series, or genre. A record with a 10 was deemed to be either  unimpeachable masterpiece or a flawed album of crucial historical significance".

Publication and reception 

In October 1995, Vintage Books published the Spin Alternative Record Guide in the United States. It was the first book compiled by Spin. After nine years in the red, the magazine had its first profitable year in 1994. Looking to expand into other print media, its founder and publisher Bob Guccione Jr. struck a deal to publish three books through Vintage. Its release was roughly timed to commemorate the magazine's 10th anniversary. The price was comparable with its competitors, with most music reference books coming in at or below $25 in 1995. According to Matthew Perpetua, the guide was reportedly "not a huge seller".

Reviewing the book in 1995, Adam Mazmanian from Library Journal recommended the Spin Alternative Record Guide to "both public and academic libraries". He found its reviews superior in "length and scope" to The Rolling Stone Album Guide (1992), which also offered complete discographies of artists ranging from Jonathan Richman to Throbbing Gristle. Mazmanian further argued that "this guide fills a gap in the literature of modern music" at a time when "alternative" has developed a ubiquitous presence in the marketing of popular music. In New York magazine, Kim France called it "a well-edited, unpretentious, and comprehensive look at all the crazy stuff the kids are listening to these days". Matt Kopka of Publishers Weekly wrote that Spins guide "may be as close to a surefire hit as the season can offer".

Booklist critic Gordon Flagg was more qualified in his praise. He applauded the accuracy of the artist entries and the quality of the contributors' reviews, but found Weisbard's conception of "alternative" ill-defined and recommended The Trouser Press Record Guide (1991) as a more comprehensive option. Even more critical was Billboard magazine's Beth Renaud, who called much of the writing biased and the organization unencyclopedic. She said Weisbard's "obligatory" essay is outdated and vague in defining alternative rock and that the contributors "gush" over artists usually covered by Spins magazine publication, with many relevant artists omitted in place of more perplexing additions. In a 1999 survey of various music guides for the Riverfront Times, Jason Toon labeled the Spin Alternative Record Guide as a "must to avoid" and dismissed it as a "flimsy, shallow... slicked-up cash-in job".

Influence and reappraisal 

Having edited the book, Weisbard put his pursuit of a PhD at UC Berkeley on hold and accepted a job offer from Spin, which marked the beginning of his career as a rock critic. Meanwhile, the guide's entry on folk guitarist John Fahey introduced his music to a new generation of listeners. His entry in the guide was written by Byron Coley, who had previously profiled Fahey for Spin in 1994 at a time when the musician lived in reclusion and was commonly believed to be dead. According to Ben Ratliff at the New York Times, Coley's writings helped revive Fahey's career by drawing renewed attention from record labels and the alternative scene. For his part, Fahey appreciated the guide's effect on his career and especially its association of his music with contemporary alternative subculture. With the arrival of a younger audience, Fahey felt vindicated in his long-standing misgivings about the marketing of his back catalog to an older demographic of listeners interested in traditionalist folk and new-age music. He wrote about the Spin guide in the liner notes of his 1997 album City of Refuge:

The book has been cited as a bellwether of trends in critical consensus from the time of its publication. For example, the book's favorable treatment of ABBA marked a significant step in the revival of the band's reputation among critics. While ABBA had always been massively popular on an international scale, earlier critics had tended to dismiss their music as frivolous, unhip, or otherwise unworthy of serious attention. Conversely, the guide's omission of the English band Talk Talk—who had released commercially successful synth-pop before adopting an experimental approach on their last two albums, which were later seen as forebears of post-rock—signaled the low point of that group's reputation among American critics.

The Spin Alternative Record Guide was a landmark in the construction of an "alternative canon", alongside The Trouser Press Record Guide and Martin C. Strong's The Great Alternative and Indie Discography. It exerted a major influence on the next generation of music critics. American pop culture critic Chuck Klosterman cited the Spin Alternative Record Guide as one of his five favorite books, saying in 2011, "I fear this might be out of print, but it's probably my favorite music book of all time. Since its 1995 publication, I doubt a year has passed when I didn't reread at least part of it." In response to a question from a 2019 interview with The New York Times Book Review, Klosterman named it as the one book he would require Donald Trump to read, providing no further explanation of his choice. Robert Christgau wrote that while most music guides and encyclopedia books were unremarkable, the Spin Alternative Record Guide was one of the few "useful exceptions" because of what he felt was the "sharpest writing" from contributors such as Weisbard and Sheffield. Idolators Chris Molanphy, on the other hand, said in retrospect that the book's list of the 100 best albums catered to "hipper, Gen-Xier tastes".

In 2011, the Spin Alternative Record Guide was included in the Pitchfork staff's list of their favorite music books. In an essay accompanying the list, Perpetua said the book's writers—either top critics at the time or those who have since become important figures in music journalism—outline the "alternative sensibility" by recognizing and connecting music from disparate genres in "an inclusive, open-minded survey, but it's defined as much by what's left out—pretty much all Boomer-oriented rock—as what it includes." According to Perpetua, the "number of young readers [who] pursued music criticism" because of the book was far greater than the copies it sold. Matthew Schnipper, editor of The Fader, bought the book after it was published and said he used it as a consumer guide for 10 years. Along with its influence on future critics, the book was cited by guitarist William Tyler as his only source of music education growing up in the pre-Internet age, having found it in a bookstore around the time it was published: "They had entries for all these different people that I had never heard of: Can, John Zorn, [John] Fahey, whatever."

Contributors 
The full list of 64 contributors appears at the back of the book. Each write-up in the guide has a single author with the exception of the entry on the 1976 album Have Moicy! and its associated artists, co-written by Marks and Salamon. The table below notes the number of entries written by each contributor, as well as the number-one record on their top ten list (if one was provided).

See also 

 1,000 Recordings to Hear Before You Die
 Album era
 Christgau's Consumer Guide: Albums of the '90s
 Christgau's Record Guide: Rock Albums of the Seventies
 Christgau's Record Guide: The '80s
 Our Band Could Be Your Life
 Trouser Press

References

Secondary sources

Citations to the Spin Alternative Record Guide

Bibliography

External links 
 
 [ Spin Alternative Record Guide] at Google Books 
 "Top 100 Alternative Records", from the appendix of the Spin Alternative Record Guide, at RockListMusic.co.uk

1995 non-fiction books
Alternative rock
American non-fiction books
Books about rock music
English-language books
Music guides
Vintage Books books